Including their antecedents, the 91st (Princess Louise's Argyllshire) Regiment; the 93rd (Sutherland Highlanders) Regiment; The Argyll and Sutherland Highlanders of Canada; and the militia battalions.

A

Major John Thompson McKellar Anderson VC DSO (1918–1943)
Sir Ian Fife Campbell Anstruther, of that Ilk, 8th Baronet of Balcaskie and 13th Baronet of Anstruther (1922–2007)
General Charles George James Arbuthnot (1801-1870), colonel of the 91st Regiment.
B
John Anderson Barstow MC, (1893–1941)
Lieutenant-Colonel Alexander Elder Beattie CMG CBE MC, (1888–1951)
Major John Hay Beith, CBE MC, (1876–1952),
Captain Claude Thomas Bissell, CC, FRSC, (1916–2000)
Major William Davidson Bissett VC (1893–1971)
Adam Black DCM (born 1898)
Lieutenant General Sir Alexander Crawford Simpson Boswell KCB CBE DL, (1928-2021)
Major-General James Robert Brunker, (1806-1869)
John Crawford Buchan VC (1892-1918)
Adam Busby (born 1948)
C
David Cameron, (born 1975)
Major General David Tennant Cowan CB, CBE, DSO, MC, (1896 – 1983)
2Lt John Crawford Buchan VC (1892–1918)
Lieutenant-Colonel Charles William Campbell, 9th Earl of Breadalbane and Holland MC, DL, JP' (1889–1959)
General Duncan Campbell of Lochnell c1763-1837, 
Gavin Campbell, 1st Marquess of Breadalbane KG, PC, JP, DL (1851–1922),
Captain Ian Campbell, 12th and 5th Duke of Argyll FRSA, (1937-2001)
Brigadier Lorne MacLaine Campbell VC, DSO & Bar, OBE, TD, (1902-1991)
Niall Diarmid Campbell, 10th and 3rd Duke of Argyll, (1872–1949)
Brigadier General Alfred Edward John Cavendish CMG (1859-1943)
Brigadier Henry James Douglas Clark, (1888-1978)
Thomas Horatio Arthur Ernest Cochrane, 1st Baron Cochrane of Cults DL, JP, LLD, (1857–1951)
Captain Sir Ivar Iain Colquhoun, 8th Baronet, JP, DL, (1916–2008)
Gen. James Robertson Craufurd (1804-1888)
Lieutenant Colonel Jock Cunningham (1902-1969). Spanish Civil War International Brigades
D
Colonel John McAusland Denny (1858–1922)
Charles Davidson Dunbar, DCM, (1870–1939)
Brig.-Maj. Archibald Campbell Douglas, 4th Baron Blythswood KCVO (1870–1929) 
Lance Corporal John Dunlay VC, (1831-1863)
Lt-Col Raymond Durie of Durie, (1905–1999)
E
George Carlyle Emslie, Baron Emslie. PC, MBE, (1919-2002)
Major John Francis Ashley Erskine, Lord Erskine GCSI, GCIE, (1895–1953)
Walter John Francis Erskine, 12th Earl of Mar and 14th Earl of Kellie KT JP (1865–1955)
F
General John Fane, 11th Earl of Westmorland GCB, GCH, PC (1784–1859)
G
2Lt James Hill Galt (born 1885)
Major John Ingles Gilmour DSO MC, (1896-1928)
Brigadier General Duncan John Glasfurd, (1873–1916)
Major-General Walter Tuckfield Goldsworthy, (1837–1911) 
Ernest Gordon (1916–2002)
 Sir Charles Stephen Gore (1793-1869)
Lieutenant General Andrew John Noble Graham CB CBE, (born 1956)
Colonel Douglas Beresford Malise Ronald Graham, 5th Duke of Montrose KT, (1852–1925)
Lieutenant Colonel Sir John Reginald Noble Graham, 3rd Baronet VC OBE, (1892–1980)
Peter Grant VC, (1824–1868)
Air Vice Marshal Alexander Gray CB, MC, RAF, (1896-1980)
Hon. Ronald Henry Fulke Greville, (1864–1908)
Lieutenant Colonel Thomas Witheridge Gubb, (born 1908)
H
Captain David Sidney Hall
James "Big Jim" Healy, (1898–1961)
Acting Captain Arthur Henderson VC, MC, (1893–1917) 
Lieutenant General Sir David Henderson KCB, KCVO, DSO, LLD,  (1862–1921)
Captain Ian Henry David Henderson MC
Alexander Forbes Hendry MC TD, (1908–1980) 
Major Jack Herbert (1908-1999) 
Lieutenant-Colonel Graham Seton Hutchison, (1890–1946)
Major-General Sir John Kennedy GBE CB CMG DSO, (1878-1948)
I
J
K
L
Pipe Major William Lawrie, (1881–1916)
Lieutenant General Sir Henry Lowther Ewart Clark Leask KCB DSO OBE, (1913-2004) 
John Aidan Liddell VC, MC, (1888–1915)
M
William Sutherland Macdonald MC, MB, CHB, DPH]] (1897-1990) 
John Duncan Mackie CBE MC, (1887–1978)
Captain Henry Maitland Macintosh, (1892-1918)
Lt David Lowe MacIntyre VC, CB, (18 June 1895 – 31 July 1967)
David MacKay VC, (1831-1880)  
Capt. Duncan Ronald Gordon Mackay. D.F.C. (k.1917)
Lieutenant-Colonel John Frederick MacKay VC, (1873-1930)
Colonel Charles Allan Maclean, CBE, MC, Croix de Guerre with palm, MA. (1892- )
General Sir Gordon Holmes Alexander MacMillan, Lord MacMillan of MacMillan of Knap, KCB, KCVO, CBE, DSO, MC, (1897-1986)
Lieutenant General Sir John Richard Alexander MacMillan KCB CBE (born 1932)
Air Vice Marshal Sir Norman Duckworth Kerr MacEwen CB, CMG, DSO, RAF, (1881–1953)
Captain George Fielden MacLeod, Baron MacLeod of Fuinary, MC, (1895–1991)
Captain Dugald Malcolm, CMG CVO TD (born 1917)
Major-General William McBean VC, (1818-1878)
Air Vice-Marshal Andrew MacGregor, (1897-1983)
Lt Col Colin Mitchell, (1925–1996)
Major Kenneth Muir VC, (1912-1950)
Colour-sergeant James Munro VC, (1826-1871)
William Hutchison Murray, (1913–1996)
N
Captain Ian Patrick Robert Napier MC, (1895–1977)
Francis James Patrick Lilley, (1907–1971)
O
Captain Charles Lindsay Orr-Ewing, (1860–1903)
P
General Sir Charles Patrick Ralph Palmer, KCVO, KBE,  
Sgt John Paton VC, (1833–1914)
Richard Dunn Pattison, (1874–1916)
Glencairn Balfour Paul CMG, (1917–2008)

Q
R
Air Vice Marshal Sir George Ranald MacFarlane Reid KCB, DSO, MC, (1893–1991)
Sir Norman Robert Reid, (1915–2007)
Acting Sergeant John Rennie, GC, (1919–1943)
Major Frederick Joseph Ricketts (21 February 1881 – 15 May 1945)
Sir David Robertson, (1890–1970)
Major General Horatio Gordon Robley, (1840–1930) 
Colonel Donald Grant Ross OBE, DL
S
Vernon Scannell, (1922–2007)
Col Sir (Michael) Hugh Shaw-Stewart, 8th Baronet (1854–1942)
Brigadier I A Sim, CBE TD (died 14 December 2018)
Colonel John Douglas Slim, 2nd Viscount Slim OBE, DL, FRGS (1927-2019)
Major Gordon Smith, (1920-2014)
Sir William McNair Snadden, 1st Baronet JP, (1896–1959)
Victor Marlborough Silvester OBE, (1900–1978)
Finlay Ballantyne Speedie MM (1880–1953)
Lt Col John David "Dave" Stewart DSO (1910–1988)
Brig Ian Stewart, (1895-1987)
Maj William George Drummond Stewart VC, (February 1831 - 19 October 1868)
2Lt Walter Riddell Sutherland (1890-1918)
T
Brigadier Ronald John Frederick "Ronnie" Tod CBE, DSO, (1905–1975)
Captain George Reid Thomson, Lord Thomson, (1893-1962)
U
V
W
Charles Laing Warr GCVO, (1892-1969)
General Sir Arthur Grenfell Wauchope GCB GCMG CIE DSO, (1874–1947)
Air Commodore James George Weir CBE CMG, (1887–1973)
Major-General Sir Alexander Wilson KCB, (1858–1937)
Patrick Wolrige-Gordon, (1935–2002)
X
Y
George Kenneth Hotson Younger, 4th Viscount Younger of Leckie KT KCVO TD PC, (1931-2003)
Z

Royal Regiment of Scotland